Limnosipanea is a genus of flowering plants belonging to the family Rubiaceae.

Its native range is Panama to Southern Tropical America.

Species:

Limnosipanea erythraeoides 
Limnosipanea palustris 
Limnosipanea spruceana

References

Rubiaceae
Rubiaceae genera